Lelo Nika (born 1969) is a Serbian and Romanian Romani accordionist who lives in Denmark. He plays a mixture of Balkan jazz and Romanian music.

He comes from Nikolinci, near Belgrade, Serbia, which has a large Romanian population. He moved with his family to Helsingør, Denmark, in 1970, for three years. Starting in 1979, he studied under Serbian accordionist Branimir Djokic. He studied at the Malmö Academy of Music in Sweden and the Danish Accordion Academy and has twice won first prize at the World Accordion Championship.

External links
 Lelo Nika homepage
 Danskmusik page about Lelo Nika

1969 births
Living people
People from Helsingør
Serbian accordionists
Serbian expatriates in Denmark
Serbian folk musicians
Serbian jazz musicians
Serbian Romani people
21st-century accordionists